The Medal of Honor of the Association of the Representatives of Bunyoro-Kitara (ARKBK) is the highest award of the organization, and can only be awarded by the President of the ARKBK. It is bestowed upon members of the ARKBK or to individuals who have distinguished themselves with "extraordinary merits, outstanding achievements and very special contributions to the Kingdom of Bunyoro-Kitara and the ARKBK".

The Medal of Honor is the only neck order of the ARKBK. Nominations are sent to the President of the ARKBK, who then decides whether or not to continue to process the application of nomination. If the application is approved, the nomination will be discussed by the President of ARKBK and the King Omukama of Bunyoro, before the award is given.

References 

 Website of the ARKBK

Orders, decorations, and medals of Bunyoro Kingdom
Awards established in 2010